Saptha libanota is a species of moth of the family Choreutidae. It is found in northern Queensland.

The wingspan is about 20 mm. Adults have forewings that are half a dark golden colour and half iridescent green. The hindwings are plain brown.

References

External links
Australian Faunal Directory
Image at choreutidae.lifedesks.org

Choreutidae
Moths of Australia
Moths described in 1910